Josef "Sepp" Zeilbauer (born 24 September 1952, in Mürzzuschlag) is a retired decathlete from Austria. His personal best in the event was 8310 points, achieved on 16 May 1976 at a competition in Götzis.

Achievements

External links
sports-reference
trackfield.brinkster

1952 births
Living people
Austrian decathletes
Athletes (track and field) at the 1972 Summer Olympics
Athletes (track and field) at the 1976 Summer Olympics
Athletes (track and field) at the 1980 Summer Olympics
Olympic athletes of Austria
Austrian male athletes
Universiade medalists in athletics (track and field)
Universiade gold medalists for Austria
Medalists at the 1975 Summer Universiade
Medalists at the 1977 Summer Universiade
Medalists at the 1979 Summer Universiade
People from Mürzzuschlag
Sportspeople from Styria